François Félix (born 19 May 1949 in Viviers), nicknamed Fanfan, is a French former professional footballer who played as a striker.

He was part of SC Bastia team that reached 1978 UEFA Cup Final.

External links
 
 
 Profile

1949 births
Living people
French footballers
Association football forwards
Olympique Lyonnais players
SC Bastia players
Paris FC players
Nîmes Olympique players
Angers SCO players
AJ Auxerre players
Ligue 1 players
French football managers